Gezer, or Tel Gezer, in  – Tell Jezar or Tell el-Jezari is an archaeological site in the foothills of the Judaean Mountains at the border of the Shfela region roughly midway between Jerusalem and Tel Aviv. It is now an Israeli national park. In the Hebrew Bible, Gezer is associated with Joshua and Solomon.

It became a major fortified Canaanite city-state in the first half of the 2nd millennium BCE. It was later destroyed by fire and rebuilt. The Amarna letters mention kings of Gezer swearing loyalty to the Egyptian pharaoh. Its importance was due in part to the strategic position it held at the crossroads of the ancient coastal trade route linking Egypt with Syria, Anatolia and Mesopotamia, and the road to Jerusalem and Jericho, both important trade routes. In modern times, Tel Gezer was the site of the Palestinian village of Abu Shusheh, the residents of which were expelled by Israeli forces during the 1948 Arab-Israeli War.

Sources

Ancient Egyptian sources
Gezer is mentioned in the victory stele of Merneptah, dating from the end of the 13th century BCE.

Biblical conquest under Joshua
The biblical story of the Israelite conquest of Canaan under their leader Joshua mentions a certain "king of Gezer" who had gone to help his countrymen in Lachish, where he met his death.

Gezer is listed in the Book of Joshua as a Levitical city, one of ten allotted to the Levite children of Kehoth - the Kohathites.

The Egyptian sack of Gezer
According to the Hebrew Bible, the only source for both the existence of Solomon and this particular event, the Sack of Gezer took place at the beginning of the 10th century BCE, when the city was conquered and burned by an unnamed Egyptian pharaoh, identified by some with Siamun, during his military campaign in Philistia. This anonymous Egyptian pharaoh then gave it to King Solomon as the dowry of his daughter. Solomon then rebuilt Gezer and fortified it.

The Bible states:

Identifying the Biblical pharaoh
The only mention in the Bible of a pharaoh who might be Siamun (ruled 986–967 BC) is the text from 1 Kings quoted above, and we have no other historical sources that clearly identify what really happened. As shown below, Kenneth Kitchen believes that Siamun conquered Gezer and gave it to Solomon. Others such as Paul S. Ash and Mark W. Chavalas disagree, and in 2001 Chavalas states that "it is impossible to conclude which Egyptian monarch ruled concurrently with David and Solomon". Professor Edward Lipinski argues that Gezer, then unfortified, was destroyed late in the 10th century (and thus not contemporary with Solomon) and that the most likely Pharaoh was Shoshenq I (ruled 943–922 BC). "The attempt at relating the destruction of Gezer to the hypothetical relationship between Siamun and Solomon cannot be justified factually, since Siamun's death precedes Solomon's accession."

Tanis temple relief
One fragmentary but well-known surviving triumphal relief scene from the Temple of Amun at Tanis believed to be related to the sack of Gezer depicts an Egyptian pharaoh smiting his enemies with a mace. According to the Egyptologist Kenneth Kitchen, this pharaoh is Siamun. The pharaoh appears here "in typical pose brandishing a mace to strike down prisoners(?) now lost at the right except for two arms and hands, one of which grasps a remarkable double-bladed axe by its socket." The writer observes that this double-bladed axe or 'halberd' has a flared crescent-shaped blade which is close in form to the Aegean-influenced double axe but is quite distinct from the Canaanite double-headed axe, which has a different shape that resembles an X. Thus, Kitchen concludes Siamun's foes were the Philistines who were descendants of the Aegean-based Sea Peoples and that Siamun was commemorating his recent victory over them at Gezer by depicting himself in a formal battle scene relief at the temple in Tanis. Alternatively, Paul S. Ash had put forward a detailed argument that Siamun's relief portrays a fictitious battle. He points out that in Egyptian reliefs Philistines are never shown holding an axe, and that there is no archaeological evidence for Philistines using axes. He also argues that there is nothing in the relief to connect it with Philistia or the Levant.

Hellenistic and Roman period
Josephus writes that a certain "Gadara" was one of the five synedria, or regional administrative capitals of the Hasmonean realm, established by the Roman proconsul of Syria, Gabinius, in 57 BCE. The name has been edited to "Gazara" in the Loeb edition, in accordance with an identification of Gadara with Gezer. However, other researchers prefer one of two candidates from Transjordan, Gadara in Perea, or Gadara of the Decapolis (see more at Perea and Gadara (disambiguation)).

Location

Gezer was located on the northern fringe of the Shephelah region, approximately thirty kilometres northwest of Jerusalem. It was strategically situated at the junction of the Via Maris, the international coastal highway, and the highway connecting it with Jerusalem through the valley of Ayalon, or Ajalon.

Verification of the identification of this site with biblical Gezer comes from bilingual inscriptions in either Hebrew or Aramaic, and Greek, found engraved on rocks several hundred meters from the tell. These inscriptions from the 1st century BCE read "boundary of Gezer" and "of Alkios" (probably the governor of Gezer at the time).

History

Chalcolithic
The first settlement established at Tel Gezer dates to the end of the 4th millennium BCE during the Chalcolithic period, when large caves cut into the rock were used as dwellings.

Early Bronze Age
At the beginning of the Early Bronze Age (early 3rd millennium BCE), an unfortified settlement covered the tell. It was destroyed in the middle of the 3rd millennium BCE and subsequently abandoned for several centuries.

Middle Bronze Age
In the Middle Bronze Age IIB (MBIIB, first half of the 2nd millennium BCE), Gezer became a major city, well fortified and containing a large cultic site. It may have grown due to MBIIA-sites like Aphek becoming weaker.

Fortifications
The fortifications consisted of two lines of defense surrounding the tell. First, an outer earthen rampart c. 5 metres high, built of compacted alternating layers of chalk and earth covered with plaster. Second, a 4 metre wide inner wall made of large stone blocks, reinforced with towers. The city gate stood near the southwest corner of the wall, was flanked by two towers which protected the wooden doors, a common design for its time.
The tell was surrounded by a massive stone wall and towers, protected by a  earthen rampart covered with plaster. The wooden city gate, near the southwestern corner of the wall, was fortified by two towers.

Cultic site with massebot
The exact purpose of these megaliths is still debated, but they may have constituted a Canaanite "high place" from the Middle Bronze Age, ca. 1600 BCE, each masseba possibly representing a Canaanite city connected to Gezer by treaties enforced by rituals performed here. Both the number and size of the standing stones confer a unique character to this cultic site. Such massebot are found elsewhere in the country, but those from Gezer massebot are the most impressive examples.
The area was almost completely cleared by Macalister. The remains were re-excavated in 1968. A double cave beneath the high place was shown to be predating it and not connected to it.

Late Bronze Age

In the Late Bronze Age (second half of the 2nd millennium BCE) a new city wall, four meters thick, was erected outside the earlier one. It is a very rare example of Late Bronze Age fortifications in the country, witness for the elevated political status of Gezer in southern Canaan during Egyptian rule.

Thutmosid Period

The Canaanite city was destroyed in a fire, presumably in the wake of a campaign by the Egyptian pharaoh Thutmose III (ruled 1479–1425 BC). The oldest known historical reference to the city is to be found on an inscription of conquered sites at Thutmose's temple at Karnak. A destruction layer from this event was found in all excavated areas of the tell.

Amarna Period

The Tell Amarna letters, dating from the 14th century BCE, include ten letters from the kings of Gezer swearing loyalty to the Egyptian pharaoh. The city-state of Gezer (named Gazru in Babylonian) was ruled by four leaders during the 20-year period covered by the Amarna letters. Discoveries of several pottery vessels, a cache of cylinder seals and a large scarab with the cartouche of Egyptian pharaoh Amenhotep III attest to the existence of a city at Gezer's location in the 14th century BCE - one that was apparently destroyed in the next century - and suggest that the city was inhabited by Canaanites with strong ties to Egypt.

In the 14th century BCE, a palace was constructed on the high western part of the tell, the city's acropolis. Archaeologists also discovered remains of what might have been the Egyptian governor's residence from the same period in the northern part of the tell.

Ramesside Period

In the late reign of Ramesses II, climate became drier and colder causing turmoil in the Mediterranean from around 1250 BC, eventually leading to the Late Bronze collapse. The death of Ramesses II caused cities in Canaan to rebel to become independent. Merneptah of Egypt, who succeeded Ramesses II, had to regain control and boasted about his capture of Gezer. A massive fiery destruction seems to support this in excavations done by Prof. Steven Ortiz.

Toward the end of the Bronze Age, the city declined and its population diminished.

Iron Age

In 12th-11th centuries BCE, a large building with many rooms and courtyards was situated on the acropolis. Grinding stones and grains of wheat found among the sherds indicate that it was a granary. Local and Philistine vessels attest to a mixed Canaanite/Philistine population. The 10th century BCE seems to have been a period of notable urban development for the city until it became destroyed in the third quarter of that century, probably as a result of Shoshenq I's campaign in Canaan at that time.

Tiglath-Pileser III and the Neo-Assyrian period
The Neo-Assyrian king Tiglath-Pileser III put Gezer under siege between the years 734 and 732 BC. The city was probably captured by the Assyrians at the end of the campaign of Tiglath-Pileser III to Canaan. A reference to Gezer may have appeared in a cuneiform relief from the 8th-century BCE royal palace of Tiglath-Pileser III at Nimrud. The siege may have been the one depicted on a stone relief at the royal palace in Nimrud, where the city was called 'Gazru'.

Hellenistic period
According to the book of 1 Maccabees, Simon Thassi captured a place called "Gazara" ("Gaza" in Greek) and expelled the population during the Maccabean Revolt.  He then brought in new settlers of devout Jews and fortified it, making it part of the Hasmonean kingdom.  Some scholars identify Gezer as the same place as the Gazara described by the author of 1 Maccabees.

Roman and Byzantine periods
Gezer was sparsely populated during Roman times and later times, as other regional population centers took its place.

Crusader period

In 1177, the plains around Gezer were the site of the Battle of Montgisard, in which the Crusaders under Baldwin IV defeated the forces of Saladin. There was a Crusader Lordship of Montgisard and apparently a castle stood there, a short distance from Ramleh.

Early modern and modern periods

Archaeological highlights

Canaanite water system

A large Canaanite (Bronze Age) water system comprising a tunnel going down to a spring, similar to those found in Jerusalem, Tel Hazor and Tel Megiddo, was first excavated by Macalister and was re-excavated as part of the 2006-17 campaigns of the Tel Gezer Excavation and Publication Project.

In 2010 a team from the biblically inerrantist New Orleans Baptist Theological Seminary ("NOBTS"), in partnership with the Israeli Parks Authority and the Israeli Antiquities Authority, launched an effort to clear a massive water tunnel, discovered first by Macalister over a hundred years earlier. Macalister never fully excavated the tunnel because a strong storm blew debris back into the tunnel and he considered it too expensive and time consuming to re-excavate the site. The NOBTS effort to re-clear and examine the tunnel has been chronicled in multiple sources including the Biblical Archaeology Review and the Baptist Press.

In 2011 professor Dennis Cole, archaeologist Dan Warner and engineer Jim Parker from NOBTS, and Tsvika Tsuk from the Israeli Parks Authority, led another team in an attempt to finish the effort. In just two years the teams removed approximately 299 tons of debris from the ancient water system.

In 2012, the team uncovered a large sealed cavern about nine meters beyond the water pool and "Macalister's Causeway."

In 2013, the team began an effort to preserve the ancient Canaanite mudbrick gate and complex near the water system.

In the Water System: "Most of the first two weeks of the dig were spent searching for the bottom step and cleaning Macalister’s causeway. Tons of debris and rocks were removed in the process. When the bottom step was located and the causeway area clear, the team excavated three probes in the pool area. Each of the pool probes reached a depth of more than six feet before the end of the season and the bottom of the pool was discovered in only one probe (Eastern probe) — the one just below the bottom step of the water shaft."

The debris removal and excavation continued until the summer of 2017.

"Gezer calendar"

One of the best-known finds is the "Gezer calendar". This is a plaque containing a text appearing to be either a schoolboy's memory exercises, or a text designated for organising the collection of taxes from farmers. Another possibility is that the text was a popular folk song, or child's song, listing the months of the year according to the agricultural seasons. It has proved to be of value by informing modern researchers of ancient Middle Eastern script and language, as well as the agricultural seasons.

Israelite city gate, wall
In 1957 Yigael Yadin identified a wall and six-chambered gateway very similar in construction to remains excavated at Megiddo and Hazor as Solomonic; they have since been reinterpreted by some as dating from several centuries later.

Boundary stones

Thirteen boundary stones have been identified near the tell, distanced between less than 200 metres to almost 2 km from it, probably dating from the Late Hellenistic period (late second - first century BCE), the most recent having been found by archaeologists from SWBTS in 2012. See also Location.

There are only a few "lost" biblical cities that have been positively identified through inscriptions discovered by means of archaeological work (surveys or digs). Gezer is the first among them thanks to Clermont-Ganneau's discovery of three such inscribed stones in 1874 and of a fourth in 1881.

Ten of the thirteen inscriptions are bilingual, including the first three ones, containing two distinct parts, one in Greek and one either Hebrew or Aramaic, and written in what is known as square Hebrew characters. Clermont-Ganneau's reading of the Hebrew/Aramaic part as "the boundary of Gezer" was later confirmed. The inscriptions' Greek part contains personal names, either (H)alkios, Alexas, or Archelaos, for instance Clermont-Ganneau's four stones were all bearing the inscription "of Alkios". Sometimes the two parts are upside-down, or "tête-bêche", in relation to each other, on the last discovered one the lines being separated by a line and the Hebrew/Aramaic inscription "Tehum Gezer" ("the boundary of Gezer") facing the tell. With the discovery of the last nine inscriptions it became evident that their distribution does not support Clermont-Ganneau's initial interpretation, of them marking Gezer's Sabbath limit, but rather that they probably mark the boundaries between private estates, or between city land and these estates. Analysis of the lettering have led to the conclusion that they were all contemporaneous, with opinions based on palaeography and history slightly diverging in regard to their date - either Hasmonean or Herodian. The earlier date and the Hebrew script can be connected to what we know from the First Book of Maccabees about Simon replacing the gentile inhabitants with Jewish ones The later date can be supported by a scenario in which Herod, after acquiring the lands of the vanquished Hasmoneans, gave them to (H)alkios, Archelaos and Alexas, all three names mentioned by Josephus for members of a powerful land-owning family from Herod's court.

Language: Hebrew or Aramaic
David M. Jacobson wrote that the inscriptions are in Hebrew and that this suggests a need for a closer look at their date.

Other scholars are not convinced that the language of the inscriptions is Hebrew and not Aramaic, leaving both options as possible as is the case in the Corpus Inscriptionum Iudaeae/Palaestinae.

Egyptian-era remains
In July 2017, archaeologists discovered skeletal remains of a family of three, one of the adults and a child wearing earrings, believed to have been killed during an Egyptian invasion in the 13th-century BCE. A 13th century BCE amulet, various scarabs and cylinder seals were also found on the site. The amulet bears the cartouches —or official royal monikers— of the Egyptian pharaohs Thutmose III and Ramses II.

Archaeological excavation history
Archaeological excavation at Gezer has been going on since the early 1900s, and it has become one of the most excavated sites in Israel. The site was identified with ancient Gezer by Charles Simon Clermont-Ganneau in 1871. R. A. Stewart Macalister excavated the site between 1902 and 1909 on behalf of the Palestine Exploration Fund. Twentyone quarterly dig reports were published in the Palestine Exploration Quarterly. Macalister recovered several artifacts and discovered several constructions and defenses. He also established Gezer's habitation strata, though due to poor stratigraphical methods, these were later found to be mostly incorrect (as well as many of his theories). In 1914 and 1921 Raymond-Charles Weill dug there, focusing mainly on the Bronze and Iron Age Tombs. Results were not published due the Weill's assistant Paule Zerlwer-Silberberg dying in a camp in occupied France and the excavation data was lost at that time. Surprisingly, the master thesis of that assistant, about the dig, was recently discovered and was published in 2012.Alan Rowe briefly visited the site in 1934. Between 1964 and 1974 G.E. Wright, William Dever and Joe Seger worked at Gezer on behalf of the Nelson Glueck School of Archaeology in the Hebrew Union College and Harvard University. Dever worked there again in 1984 and 1990, with the Andrews University.

Latest excavations and surveys (2006-2017)
Excavations were renewed in June 2006 by a consortium of institutions under the direction of Steve Ortiz of the Southwestern Baptist Theological Seminary (SWBTS) and Sam Wolff of the Israel Antiquities Authority (IAA). The Tel Gezer Excavation and Publication Project is a multi-disciplinary field project investigating the Iron Age history of Gezer. The effort completed in 2017.

The first season of the Gezer excavations concluded successfully and revealed some interesting details. Among other things is a discovery of a thick destruction layer may be dated to the destruction at the hands of the Egyptians, which some associate with the biblical episode from : "Pharaoh, the king of Egypt, had attacked and captured Gezer, killing the Canaanite population and burning it down. He gave the city to his daughter as a wedding gift when she married Solomon."

In 2013, two separate archaeological survey-excavations were conducted at Tel Gezer, one by Tsvika Tsuk, Yohanan Hagai, and Daniel Warner, on behalf of the IAA, and the other led by a team of archaeologists from the SWBTS and Andrews University's Institute of Archaeology.

See also
Cities of the ancient Near East
Archaeology of Israel

References

Further reading
William G. Dever, Gezer Revisited: New Excavations of the Solomonic and Assyrian Period Defenses, The Biblical Archaeologist, Vol. 47, No. 4 (Dec., 1984), pp. 206–218
Dever, William G., "Visiting the Real Gezer: A Reply to Israel Finkelstein", Journal of the Institute of Archaeology of Tel Aviv University, Volume 30, Number 2, September 2003, pp. 259–282(24)
"Confronting the Past: Archaeological and Historical Essays on Ancient Israel", Seymour Gitin, (ed), Eisenbrauns, (January 2006),

External links

New Orleans Baptist Theological Seminary's Official Record of the Tel Gezer Excavation
The Tel Gezer Excavation and Publication Project (as of 2021); see also 2010 version.
Tel Gezer Excavation Ceramic Database

Amarna letters locations
Archaeological sites in Israel
Ancient Jewish settlements of Judaea
Tribe of Ephraim
Levitical cities
Buildings and structures in Central District (Israel)
Canaanite cities
Former populated places in Southwest Asia
Hebrew Bible cities
Land of Israel
Megalithic monuments in the Middle East
National parks of Israel
Protected areas of Central District (Israel)
Tells (archaeology)
4th-millennium BC establishments
Populated places established in the 4th millennium BC
10th-century BC disestablishments
Populated places disestablished in the 10th century BC
Phoenician cities